In mathematics the term Hilbert dimension may refer to:

 Hilbert space dimension
 Hilbert dimension in ring theory, see Hilbert's basis theorem

See also
 Hilbert series and Hilbert polynomial